Asindulum is a genus of flies belonging to the family Keroplatidae.

The genus was first described by Latreille in 1805.

The species of this genus are found in Europe and Northern America.

Species:
 Asindulum nigrum Latreille, 1805

References

Keroplatidae